Ron Carlson (born 1947) is an American novelist, short story writer and professor.

Life
Carlson was born in  Logan, Utah, and grew up in Salt Lake City. He received a master's degree in English from the University of Utah. He then taught at The Hotchkiss School in Connecticut, where he began his first novel. 
He became a professor of English at Arizona State University in 1985, teaching creative writing to undergraduates and graduates, and ultimately becoming director of its Creative Writing program. Carlson then moved to the University of California, Irvine. Carlson was the director of UCI's Creative Writing program until his resignation in 2018.

His short stories originally appeared in The New Yorker, Harper's Magazine, Esquire, and GQ.  In addition to his fiction, Carlson has also written for The New York Times Book Review and the Los Angeles Times Book Review.

He wrote of his first "good" story: "I did not understand my story; many times you don’t. It’s not your job to understand or evaluate or edit your work when you first emerge from it. Your duty is to be in love with it, and that defies explanation." (Ron Carlson Writes A Story) 

The short story "Keith", from The Hotel Eden, was adapted into a film by Todd Kessler (2008). The independent movie starred, among others, Jesse McCartney and Elisabeth Harnois.

In August 2018, Carlson was named as one of a number of former teachers at the Hotchkiss School against whom credible evidence of having committed sexual assault on a minor student was found.  The report to the board of Hotchkiss was prepared by the respected law firm of Locke Lord who conducted a wide-ranging investigation.

Awards
He has received a number of honors and awards, including a National Endowment for the Arts Fellowship in Fiction, a National Society of Arts and Letters Award, and the 1993 Ploughshares Cohen Prize.

Bibliography

Poetry

Novels 
Betrayed by F. Scott Fitzgerald (1977)
Truants (1981)

Return to Oakpine. Viking. 2013. .

YA Novel 
The Speed of Light, HarperTempest, 2003,

Short stories 
News of the World (1987)
Plan B for the Middle Class (1992; a New York Times Best Book that year)
 (an NYT Notable Book)
 (a Los Angeles Times 2002 best book)

Non-fiction 
Ron Carlson Writes a Story (2007), subtitled: "From the first glimmer of an idea to the final sentence."

Anthologies
 Best American Short Stories
 Sudden Fiction
 Best of the West Epoch
 In Our Lovely Deseret: Mormon Fictions
 The North American Review
 The O'Henry Prize Series
 The Pushcart Prize Anthology
 Norton Anthology of Short Fiction.

References

External links

"Ron Carlson Abridged", Elephant Rock Productions. Archived from the original.
"Author Talk: Ron Carlson", TeenReads. Archived from the original.
http://www.pshares.org/authors/author-detail.cfm?authorID=1860 now here maybe?
The N, a short story, Narrative Magazine (Spring 2007).

20th-century American novelists
Living people
1947 births
Writers from Logan, Utah
University of California, Irvine faculty
Arizona State University faculty
Writers from Salt Lake City
University of Utah alumni
21st-century American novelists
American male novelists
American male short story writers
20th-century American short story writers
21st-century American short story writers
20th-century American male writers
21st-century American male writers
Novelists from Arizona
Novelists from Utah